Portrait of Wes is an album by the American jazz guitarist Wes Montgomery, released in 1966.

History
Portrait of Wes was Montgomery's second to last recording for Riverside Records; his performances in October and November 1963 were issued as two albums, Portrait of Wes and Guitar on the Go. Montgomery, who had worked with Melvin Rhyne for his first recordings for Riverside, worked with him again for his last Riverside performance. Portrait of Wes was reissued in the Original Jazz Classics series, with additional alternate takes.

Reception 

AllMusic jazz critic Scott Yanow wrote: "The brilliant guitarist is in fine form on these appealing tunes with the highlights including 'Freddie the Freeloader,' 'Blues Riff' and 'Moanin.'"

Track listing

Original issue by Riverside
Side 1:
"Freddie the Freeloader" (Miles Davis) – 5:14
"Lolita" (Barry Harris) – 6:32
"Movin' Along" (Wes Montgomery) – 6:16
Side 2:
"Dangerous" (Montgomery) – 7:03
"Yesterday's Child" (Charles DeForest) – 4:14
"Moanin'" (Bobby Timmons) – 5:48

Original Jazz Classics reissue
"Freddie Freeloader" (Miles Davis) – 5:16
"Lolita" (Barry Harris) – 6:36
"Blues Riff" (Wes Montgomery) – 6:18
"Blues Riff" [Alternate take] (Wes Montgomery) – 8:14
"Dangerous" (Wes Montgomery) – 7:03
"Yesterday's Child" (Charles DeForest) – 4:14
"Moanin'" (Bobby Timmons) – 5:48
"Moanin'" [Alternate take] (Timmons) – 4:35

Personnel
 Wes Montgomery – guitar
 Melvin Rhyne – organ
 George Brown – drums

Production
 Orrin Keepnews – producer
 Ray Fowler – engineer
 Sam Alexander – album design
 Carl Grassini – cover painting

References

External links
Jazz Discography

1963 albums
Wes Montgomery albums
Albums produced by Orrin Keepnews
Riverside Records albums